YKS may refer to:

 Yuk Keep Smile (YKS), an Indonesian TV series from 2013 to 2014
 YKS, IATA code for Yakutsk Airport, Russia
 YKS, abbreviation for Yokukansan, a traditional Asian herbal medicine
 YKS, a Chapman code for Yorkshire
 YKS, the nationwide university entrance exam in Turkey.

See also
 Waco YKS, a range of American single-engine biplanes